Cressett may refer to:

Henry Cressett Pelham (1729–1803), British politician, known as Henry Pelham until 1792
James Cressett (1655–1710), English diplomat
St Michael's Church, Upton Cressett, redundant Anglican church

See also
CRESST (disambiguation)
Cressat
Cresset
Creuset (disambiguation)